Emma Üffing (8 April 1914 - 9 September 1955) - in religion Maria Euthymia - was a German Roman Catholic professed religious from the Clemens Sisters (official title: Sisters of Charity of the Blessed Virgin and Our Lady of Sorrows). Üffing was born to humble farmers and worked as an apprentice in home management until she decided to enter the religious life in the interwar period - she assumed her religious name in honor of a nun she once knew.

Üffing worked in various German hospitals in her religious career and she also tended to ill people during World War II. She tended to foreigners who were admitted into these hospitals such as Russian and British people and was hailed as an "Angel of Love" due to her affectionate care of the patients under her care.

Her cause for sainthood was initiated under Pope Paul VI on 9 January 1976 and she was titled as a Servant of God before Pope John Paul II named her as Venerable on 1 September 1988 and later beatified her on 7 October 2001.

Life
Emma Üffing was born in the German Empire on 8 April 1914 as the ninth of eleven children to August Üffing (1868 - 8 December 1932) and Maria Schmidt (1878-1975) - her father's second marriage. Üffing received her baptism mere hours later in the parish church of Halverde. She had at least five sisters and four brothers.

In October 1915 she contracted some form of rickets that stunted her growth as a result and also left her in the shadow of poor health for the remainder of her life.

Üffing made her First Communion on 27 April 1924 and received her Confirmation on 3 September 1924 from Bishop Johannes Poggenburg.

In her childhood she worked on her parents' farm (until she turned seventeen) and felt called to the religious life in her adolescence in 1928. She then commenced a period of apprenticeship in the field of housekeeping management at the hospital of Saint Ann in Hopsten on 1 November 1931 and concluded this period of education in May 1933. During this period she came to know the Clemens Sisters and met the superior Euthymia Linnenkämper who appreciated her attitude of constant service to others. She returned home in December 1932 to tend to her ailing father though he later died not long after she returned on 8 December 1932. On 25 March 1934 - with the explicit permission of her mother - she sent a letter to the motherhouse of the Clemens Sister in Münster asking to be admitted into the order though the superiors were hesitant due to her frail health; the superiors later relented and approved of her request to be admitted and she became one of 47 other postulants.

Üffing entered the Clemens Sisters on 23 July 1933 and at once assumed her new religious name in honor of the nun she once knew with the same name. She took her initial vows on 11 October 1936 and made her full solemn profession on 15 September 1940. After she made her initial vows she sent a letter to her mother in which she said: "I found Him who my heart loves; I want to hold Him and never let him go".

In October 1936 she was assigned to work at Saint Vincent's Hospital in Dinslaken and she graduated from her nursing program with special distinctions on 3 September 1939 - not long after the start of World War II with the Polish invasion. The nun worked as a nurse during the conflict and in 1943 was assigned to nurse prisoners of war and foreign workers who had infectious diseases and she tended to the likes of British and Ukrainian people though Polish and Russian foreigners would later flood in. One of her P.O.W. patients - Father Emile Esche - said: "Sister Euthymia's life was a canticle of hope in the midst of the war".

The conclusion of the war in 1945 saw her assigned to the washrooms of the Dinslaken hospital and later on 14 January 1948 saw her sent to work in her order's motherhouse and the Saint Raphael Clinic in Münster. She was ill for a brief period of time after contracting a high fever on 24 March 1945 while working.

On 8 July 1955 she was diagnosed with bowel cancer after she experienced a sudden collapse while at work in the washhouse. At the end of August 1955 she suffered an extreme fever and was confined to her bed - she also requested for the Anointing of the Sick.

Üffing died at 7:30am on 9 September 1955 from bowel cancer; she had received her final Communion at 6:00am. During her viewing - before her funeral - a fellow sister went to her remains asking for her intercession in healing a hand she had burned in an ironing accident, of which she was later healed. Her remains were exhumed in 1985 and were reburied.

Beatification

The beatification process commenced under Pope Paul VI on 9 January 1976 after the Congregation for the Causes of Saints issued the official "nihil obstat" ('nothing against') to the cause and titled her as a Servant of God. The cognitional process was then held in Münster and received validation from the C.C.S. on 14 December 1981.

The submission of the official Positio dossier to the C.C.S. in 1986 allowed for a board of theologians to voice their approval to the cause's merits in their meeting of 12 January 1988 while the cardinal and bishop members of the C.C.S. themselves also granted their approval to the cause on 26 April 1988. This in turn allowed for Pope John Paul II to issue his final approval and name Üffing as Venerable on 1 September 1988 after confirming that the late nun had in fact lived a model Christian life of heroic virtue.

The miracle required for her beatification was investigated in the German diocese of its origin and after the process received the validation of the C.C.S. on 10 July 1992 which allowed for a special medical board to evaluate the documents presented to them and approve the cause on 4 March 1999. A board of theologians likewise approved the healing to be a legitimate miracle in their meeting of 22 October 1999 while the C.C.S. issued their own approval on 7 March 2000. John Paul II issued his final approval to the miracle on 1 July 2000 and beatified Üffing on 7 October 2001 in Saint Peter's Square.

The current postulator assigned to this cause is Dr. Andrea Ambrosi.

References

External links
Hagiography Circle
Saints SQPN
Euthymia

1914 births
1955 deaths
20th-century venerated Christians
20th-century German Roman Catholic nuns
Beatifications by Pope John Paul II
Burials in North Rhine-Westphalia
Deaths from colorectal cancer
Female wartime nurses
German beatified people
German nurses
People from Steinfurt (district)
Venerated Catholics
Venerated Catholics by Pope John Paul II
World War II nurses